is a railway station in the city of Nagaoka, Niigata, Japan, operated by the East Japan Railway Company (JR East).

Lines
Raikōji Station is served by the Shin'etsu Main Line and is 63.6 kilometers from the terminus of the line at Naoetsu Station.

Station layout

The station consists of two ground-level opposed side platforms connected by a footbridge, serving two tracks. It has a Midori no Madoguchi-staffed ticket office.

Platforms

History
Raikōji Station opened on 27 December 1898.  The present station building was completed in November 1979. The station was also served by the now-defunct Uonuma Line from 1911–1984, and the Nagaoka Line from 1921–1995. With the privatization of Japanese National Railways (JNR) on 1 April 1987, the station came under the control of JR East.

Passenger statistics
In fiscal 2017, the station was used by an average of 556 passengers daily (boarding passengers only).

Surrounding area
 Raikōji Post Office
 Koshiji Middle School
 Koshiji Elementary School

See also
 List of railway stations in Japan

References

External links

 JR East station information 

Railway stations in Nagaoka, Niigata
Railway stations in Japan opened in 1898
Shin'etsu Main Line
Stations of East Japan Railway Company